The French Shore (French: Côte française de Terre-Neuve), also called The Treaty Shore, resulted from the 1713 ratifications  of the Treaty of Utrecht. The provisions of the treaty allowed the French to fish in season along the north coast of Newfoundland between Cape Bonavista and Point Riche. This area had been frequented by fishermen from Brittany since the early 16th century, which they called "le petit nord" (the little North).

In the 1783 Treaty of Versailles, the boundary points of the French Shore were changed to Cape St. John and Cape Ray, as shown in the accompanying map, with France being granted exclusive rights.

In 1904, as a result of the Entente Cordiale, the French relinquished their rights on the French Shore against territorial changes in Africa.

The history of the French Shore is depicted on the French Shore Tapestry, finished in 2010 and now on display in Conche, Newfoundland. It measures  in length.

References

Further reading 
 Hennichová, Marcela. "The French Shore as a Neuralgic Point of Anglo-French Relations - A Contribution to the History of One Rivalry." Central European Journal of Canadian Studies 16 (2021): 55-67.
 Hiller, James K. "The Newfoundland Fisheries Issue in Anglo-French Treaties, 1713-1904." Journal of Imperial and Commonwealth History 24.1 (1996): 1-23.
 Hiller, James K. "Utrecht Revisited: The Origins of French Fishing Rights in Newfoundland Waters." Newfoundland Studies 7.1 (1991): 23-39.

External links
 Overview article with maps
 French Shore Tapestry Website

Water transport in Newfoundland and Labrador
History of Saint Pierre and Miquelon
1783 establishments in North America
1904 disestablishments in North America
France–United Kingdom relations
New France
Fishing areas of the Atlantic Ocean
History of fishing
Economy of Newfoundland and Labrador
Political history of Newfoundland and Labrador
Santo Domingo
1904 disestablishments in the French colonial empire
Bilateral relations of the Dominion of Newfoundland